Kyler is a masculine given name and an alternate spelling of Cuyler. Notable people with the name include:

Kyler Edwards (born 1999), American basketball player
Kyler Fackrell (born 1991), American football player
Kyler Gordon (born 1999), American football player
Kyler Jukes (born 1979), Canadian football player
Kyler Kerbyson (born 1993), American football player
Kyler Kleibrink (born 1995), Canadian curler
Kyler Murray (born 1997), American football player
Kyler Pettis (born 1992), American actor

See also
Kyle

English-language masculine given names